SM U-99 was one of the 329 submarines serving in the Imperial German Navy in World War I.

U-99 was engaged in the naval warfare and took part in the First Battle of the Atlantic.

Design
U-99 had a displacement of  when at the surface and  while submerged. The submarine was powered by two  engines for use while surfaced, and two  engines for use while submerged. She had two propeller shafts.

U-99 was fitted with six  torpedo tubes (four at the bow and two at the stern), twelve to sixteen torpedoes, and one  SK L/45 deck gun. She had a complement of thirty-six (thirty-two crew members and four officers).

Operations 
The Royal Navy submarine  is credited with sinking U-99 in the Northern North Sea on 7 July 1917, although the attribution is uncertain.

References

Notes

Citations

Bibliography

World War I submarines of Germany
Type U 57 submarines
Ships built in Bremen (state)
1917 ships
U-boats commissioned in 1917
U-boats sunk by British submarines
Ships lost with all hands
Maritime incidents in 1917